Husler is a surname. Notable people with the surname include:

Ann Husler (1803–1874), English quarry owner and stone merchant
Horace Husler (1890−1959), English footballer
Marc-Andrea Hüsler (born 1996), Swiss tennis player
Thoriq Husler (1963–2020), Indonesian politician

See also
Busler